Trooper is the self-titled debut studio album by Canadian rock band Trooper, released in 1975. The album was produced by Randy Bachman of Bachman–Turner Overdrive and The Guess Who. The album would produce two Canadian hits "Baby Woncha Please Come Home" and "General Hand Grenade".

Track listing
(McGuire/Smith)
 3:19 - "I'm in Trouble Again" 
 3:06 - "General Hand Grenade"
 7:14 - "All of the Time" (McGuire/Smith/Kalensky)
 3:20 - "Eddy Takes It Easy"
 4:48 - "Roller Rink"
 3:04 - "Baby Woncha Please Come Home"
 5:17 - "Love of My Life"
 3:50 - "Don't Stop Now"

Personnel 

 Ra McGuire - vocals
 Brian Smith - guitar
 Tommy Stewart - drums
 Harry Kalensky - bass

Singles

 "Baby Woncha Please Come Home" / "Roller Rink"
 "General Hand Grenade" / " "Don't Stop Now"

References

Trooper (band) albums
1975 debut albums